Polyommatus ahmadi is a butterfly of the family Lycaenidae. It was described by Frédéric Carbonell in 2001. It is found in the Zanjan Province of Iran.

References

Butterflies described in 2001
Polyommatus
Butterflies of Asia